D94 may refer to:
 D 94 road (United Arab Emirates)
 HMS Activity (D94), a British Royal Navy escort carrier